Adam Piotr Bodnar (born 6 January 1977) is a Polish lawyer, educator, and human rights activist. He was the Polish Ombudsman for Citizen Rights from 2015 until July 2021.

Life and career
In 2000, he graduated in law from the University of Warsaw and in 2001 he obtained the Master of Law degree in the field of comparative constitutional law from the Central European University in Budapest. He also completed a course in European Law co-organized with Cambridge University as well as American Law co-organized with the University of Florida at the Faculty of Law and Administration of the University of Warsaw. In 2006, he received a PhD degree from the University of Warsaw on the basis of his dissertation entitled Multi-level Citizenship in the European Constitutional Sphere. In 2019, he obtained habilitation at his alma mater.

He worked as an assistant professor at the Department of Human Rights of the Faculty of Law and Administration of the University of Warsaw as well as academic teacher at the SWPS University of Social Sciences and Humanities in Warsaw.

In the 1990s he collaborated with the anti-racist Never Again Foundation. Until 2004, he worked at the Weil, Gotshal & Manges law office. He then became a member of the Helsinki Human Rights Foundation (Polish: Helsińska Fundacja Praw Człowieka). In 2008, he served as an expert at the European Union Agency for Fundamental Rights (FRA) where he specialized in the observance of human rights in Poland. In 2010, he was appointed deputy director of the Helsinki Human Rights Foundation. He also served as chairman of the Panoptykon Foundation as well as Director of the Zbigniew Hołda Association. He was also a member of the board of directors of the UN Fund for Victims of Torture. In 2011 he was awarded with the Tolerance Prize by the Polish LGBT organizations and in 2013 he received a scholarship within the scope of German Marshall Memorial Fellowship programme.

In 2015, he was appointed as the Polish Ombudsman after receiving endorsement of the Civic Platform, Democratic Left Alliance and Polish People's Party. During his tenure he brought a number of local governments to court for their introduction of the controversial LGBT-free zones, which met with criticism from the ruling conservative Law and Justice party. In 2018, he was awarded the Thorolf Rafto Memorial Prize for the promotion of the fundamental human rights of intellectual and political freedom.

In 2019, he was awarded the Rule of Law Award conferred by the World Justice Project for his "outstanding efforts in strengthening the rule of law in difficult circumstances". He dedicated the award to Karol Modzelewski. The same year he received the Human Dignity Award from the Roland Berger Foundation; however, he declined the award motivating his decision by the Nazi past of the award founder's father. In September 2020, he was awarded the French Order of Legion of Honour for guarding the civic rights and values in Poland. Bodnar has appeared in leading universities' events including at Yale.

Bodnar's five-year term of office expired in September 2020. The two chambers of the Polish parliament (the Sejm and the Senate) could not agree on a successor. On 15 April 2021, the Constitutional Tribunal issued a ruling that he should stay in office for at most three further months.

Selected publications
The Emerging Constitutional Law of the European Union. German and Polish Perspectives (co-author), Springer, Berlin 2003.
Introduction to Polish Law (co-author with Stanisław Frankowski), Kluwer Law International, The Hague 2005.
Przekonania moralne władzy publicznej a wolność jednostki. Materiały z konferencji z dnia 23 stycznia 2006 r. (co-author), Zakład Praw Człowieka. Wydział Prawa i Administracji. University of Warsaw, Warsaw 2007.
Obywatelstwo wielopoziomowe. Status jednostki w europejskiej przestrzeni konstytucyjnej, Wydawnictwo Sejmowe, Warsaw 2008.
Orientacja seksualna i tożsamość płciowa. Aspekty prawne i społeczne (co-author), Instytut Wydawniczy EuroPrawo, Warsaw 2009.
Fakt vs. Opinia. Rozważania na kanwie sprawy Michnik vs. Zybertowicz. Materiały z konferencji zorganizowanej przez Obserwatorium Wolności Mediów w Polsce w dniu 26 marca 2009 roku, Helsińska Fundacja Praw Człowieka, Warsaw 2010.
Pr@wo w sieci. Korzyści czy zagrożenia dla wolności słowa? Materiały z konferencji zorganizowanej przez Obserwatorium Wolności Mediów w Polsce w dniu 11 maja 2009 roku (co-author), Helsińska Fundacja Praw Człowieka, Warsaw 2010.
Wolność słowa w prasie lokalnej. Prasa lokalna a normy ochrony konkurencji i pluralizm medialny. Materiały z konferencji zorganizowanej przez Obserwatorium Wolności Mediów w Polsce w dniu 29 października 2009 roku (co-author), Helsińska Fundacja Praw Człowieka, Warsaw 2010.
Postępowania dyscyplinarne w wolnych zawodach prawniczych – model ustrojowy i praktyka. Materiały z konferencji z dnia 5 marca 2012 r. (co-author), Helsińska Fundacja Praw Człowieka, Warsaw 2013.
Listy od przyjaciół. Księga pamiątkowa dla Profesora Wiktora Osiatyńskiego (editor), Helsińska Fundacja Praw Człowieka and Open Society Foundations, Warsaw 2015.
Ochrona praw obywatelek i obywateli Unii Europejskiej. 20 lat – osiągnięcia i wyzwania na przyszłość (co-author), Wolters Kluwer, Warsaw 2018.
Wpływ Europejskiej Konwencji Praw Człowieka na funkcjonowanie biznesu (co-author), Wolters Kluwer, Warsaw 2016.
Wykonywanie orzeczeń Europejskiego Trybunału Praw Człowieka w Polsce. Wymiar instytucjonalny, Wolters Kluwer Polska, Warsaw 2018, .

See also
Politics of Poland
Ombudsman

References

1977 births
Lawyers from Warsaw
Polish educators
Polish human rights activists
Ombudsmen in Poland
Living people
University of Warsaw alumni
People from Trzebiatów